Kapar is a village in Kuhsar Rural District, in the Central District of Shazand County, Markazi Province, Iran. At the 2006 census, its population was 118, in 20 families.

References 

Populated places in Shazand County